Rear-Admiral Alexander Innes (died 1786) was a Royal Navy officer who became Commander-in-Chief of the Jamaica Station.

Naval career
Promoted to post captain on 25 June 1756, Innes was given command of the sixth-rate HMS Mermaid in 1756. He then took command of the fourth-rate HMS Enterprise in 1758 and of the third-rate HMS Hampton Court in 1762 and took part in the Battle of Havana in summer of that year during the Anglo-Spanish War. After that he was then given command of the second-rate HMS Queen in 1778. He went on to be Commander-in-Chief of the Jamaica Station with his flag in the 50-gun  in 1786 but died in office.

References

Sources

Royal Navy rear admirals
1786 deaths